David John Hodgett (born 18 September 1963) is an Australian politician. He has been a Liberal member of the Victorian Legislative Assembly since 2006, representing the electorates of Kilsyth (2006–2014) and Croydon (2014–present). He was the Deputy Leader of the Liberal Party from December 2014 to December 2018.

Hodgett was born in Cooma, New South Wales, and before his involvement in politics worked as a Human Relations manager for Centrelink's Area North Victorian office and as a registrar  . He received a Bachelor of Business and Management in 1996 from the Royal Melbourne Institute of Technology, a Graduate Diploma in 1998 from the Australian Institute of Company Directors, a Graduate Certificate in eBusiness and Communication in 2002 from Swinburne University of Technology, and an Advanced Diploma in 2004, again from the Australian Institute of Company Directors. In 1997 he was elected to Yarra Ranges Shire Council, serving several periods as mayor (1998–99, 2004, 2004–05).

Hodgett left the council in 2005 and was preselected as the Liberal candidate for the Labor seat of Kilsyth for the 2006 state election. He successfully contested the seat of Croydon at the 2014 Victorian state election.

Hodgett is married with seven children.

Hodgett currently holds three shadow ministry portfolios. He currently holds the positions of Shadow Minister for Education, Higher Education, Training and Skills and Early Childhood and Children.

References

External links
 Parliamentary voting record of David Hodgett at Victorian Parliament Tracker

1963 births
Living people
Liberal Party of Australia members of the Parliament of Victoria
Members of the Victorian Legislative Assembly
RMIT University alumni
21st-century Australian politicians